The Bloody Bay poison frog (Mannophryne olmonae) is a species of frog in the family Aromobatidae.

It is endemic to the island of Tobago in the Republic of Trinidad and Tobago. Its natural habitats are subtropical or tropical moist lowland forest and streams mainly in the northeastern mountainous half of the island. This classified "critically Endangered" species according to the IUCN Global Amphibian Assessment conducted a survey and that based on the population that surveyed out over 23 extralimital populations and has been found in a variety of forest that included degraded secondary forest and abandoned cacao plantations.

References

Lehtinen, R. M., Calkins, T. L., Novick, A. M., & McQuigg, J. L. (2015, June 1). Reassessing the Conservation Status of an Island Endemic Frog. Retrieved October 14, 2019, from https://bioone.org/journals/journal-of-herpetology/volume-50/issue-2/14-161/Reassessing-the-Conservation-Status-of-an-Island-Endemic-Frog/10.1670/14-161.full.

Mannophryne
Amphibians described in 1983
Endemic fauna of Trinidad and Tobago
Amphibians of Trinidad and Tobago
Taxonomy articles created by Polbot